Carl Crook (born 10 November 1963, in Bolton) is an English former professional lightweight and light welterweight boxer. As an amateur, he was runner-up in the 1985 Amateur Boxing Association of England (ABAE) lightweight championship against Eamon McAuley of Hogarth Amateur Boxing Club, As a professional, he won the Central Area lightweight title, British lightweight title, and the Commonwealth lightweight title, and was also a challenger for the EBU (European) lightweight title.

It was only after 117 amateur bouts he emerged as a professional and captured two lightweight titles. Carl and his family moved from Bolton to Adlington and he made his debut in boxing in Chorley. Carl had to wait until  January 27, 1975 for his first bout as he was not allowed to fight until he is 11 years old. In 1980 he joined army and continued his love and passion for the sport. He missed out on an opportunity to represent Britain in the Olympic Games in 1984 as he lost the ABA Finals. Carl claimed his first title at the Preston Guild Hall against Moroccan-born Najib Daho in 1990. In May 1992, he gained British and Commonwealth defenses against Glaswegian Steve Boyle in Preston. Carl's last pro-fight was quite memorable in Levallois, France a knockout against Jean-Baptiste Mendy in his second European title attempt in April 1993. It was a voluntary title defense and took Jean-Baptiste Mendy to eight or ninth round. Now, he gives shape training at Natbridge Boxing Club, Leyland, offering advice to younger fighters.

References

External links

1963 births
English male boxers
Light-welterweight boxers
Lightweight boxers
Living people
Sportspeople from Bolton